Sazin (also Romanized as Sāzīn; also known as Sārīn and Sāzan) is a village in Khararud Rural District, in the Central District of Khodabandeh County, Zanjan Province, Iran. At the 2006 census, its population was 222, in 45 families.

References 

Populated places in Khodabandeh County
SAZINCO.IR
شرکت سازین